Ward No. 6 is a 2009 Russian drama film directed by Aleksandr Gornovsky and Karen Shakhnazarov.

Plot 
The film tells about the doctor of the provincial psychiatric hospital Ragin, who meets a patient with his own philosophy, as a result of communication with which he himself becomes crazy.

Cast 
 Vladimir Ilyin as Ragin
 Aleksey Vertkov as Gromov
 Aleksandr Pankratov-Chyorny as Mikhail Averyanovich
 Yevgeny Stychkin as Khobotov
 Viktor Solovyov as Nikita
 Aleksey Zharkov as Old chief physician
 Albina Evtushevskaya as Darya
 Anna Sinyakina
 Alina Olshanskaya
 Stanislav Eventov

Reception

Critical response
Ward No.6 has an approval rating of 67% on review aggregator website Rotten Tomatoes, based on 6 reviews, and an average rating of 6.00/10.

See also
 List of submissions to the 82nd Academy Awards for Best Foreign Language Film 
 List of Russian submissions for the Academy Award for Best Foreign Language Film

References

External links 
 

2009 films
2000s Russian-language films
Russian drama films
2009 drama films
Films directed by Karen Shakhnazarov